I Can Do Bad All by Myself is a 2009 American romantic musical comedy-drama film which was released on September 11, 2009. The film was directed, produced, and written by Tyler Perry, who also makes an appearance in the film as his signature character Madea. The rest of the cast consists of Taraji P. Henson, Adam Rodriguez, Brian White, Mary J. Blige, Gladys Knight, and Marvin L. Winans. Although the film and play share the same title, the film is not an adaptation of Perry's play of the same name; the two works have different storylines as this film tells the story of an alcoholic lounge singer who is persuaded to take the custody of her niece and nephews by Madea after she catches them breaking into her house and their grandmother has gone missing. It is the fifth film in the Madea cinematic universe.

Despite receiving generally mixed reviews from critics, I Can Do Bad All by Myself was a box office success, grossing $51.7 million worldwide against a $19 million budget.

Plot

The film opens with April, a self-centered, alcoholic singer, performing at the nightclub Club Indigo where she works.

On the other side of town, Madea and Joe Simmons catch Jennifer, Manny, and Byron breaking into their house. After hearing the children’s troubles, Madea welcomes and feeds them. Manny tells Madea that they're living with their grandmother Rose, whom they haven't seen in four days, and their mother is deceased. They tell her that their only other relative is their Aunt April.

April shares her home with her abusive boyfriend Randy, who's married with children. The next morning, Madea brings the kids to April's house, but April doesn’t want to be bothered. Meanwhile, Pastor Brian sends a Colombian immigrant named Sandino to her house for work and a place to stay. April puts Sandino in her basement and wants to lock him down there because she doesn't know him that well. While working around the house, Sandino surprises April by cleaning himself up. When Randy arrives, he sees April with the kids and Sandino and heckles him while making not-so subtle advances at Jennifer.

Shortly afterward, Pastor Brian and Wilma, a church member, come to inform April that her mother Rose died from a fatal brain aneurysm while riding on a city bus and was cremated. April is devastated by the news and seeks comfort from Randy. However, he is sleeping and shrugs her off. Later, Sandino comforts April as she tells him about her mother's death and the last time she spoke with her. Shortly afterward, Jennifer, Manny, and Byron return to April's after searching for their grandmother, and April dejectedly tells them the news.

Depressed, Jennifer goes to Madea wanting to know how to pray. Inexperienced with prayer, Madea attempts to instruct her in a scene that plays out comically.

Later that night, Tanya, Club Indigo's bartender, sings "I Can Do Bad". Before singing the song, Tanya strongly confronts April about her attitude. She says that April must change her selfish ways and think about the safety of Byron, Manny and Jennifer. Tanya declares she loves April, but says she can’t help her unless she helps herself.

Over time, Sandino and April become good friends. Sandino fixes a ruined bedroom in her house. This makes Manny and Byron happy, but upsets Jennifer, who feels April does not want them there. While on a date, Sandino tells April he doesn't understand why she is with Randy and asks if she loves Randy. He tells her what true love is to him. One Sunday morning, Sandino eagerly knocks on April's bedroom door to get April ready for church, but Randy threatens to kill Sandino if he continues to spend time with April.

The next night, Manny needs his insulin shot and Jennifer goes to the kitchen to get it. As she prepares the shot, Randy approaches and attempts to rape her, but Sandino fights him off. April walks in on the fight, and Randy claims Jennifer offered him sex for money. April pretends to believe him and sends Randy to take a bath. When he is in the tub, April threatens to electrocute him with a plugged-in radio. Sandino arrives and tries to stop her, but April is enraged, as she explains that she was sexually abused by her stepfather Lee, who then lied about it to her mother, thus causing April to lose her faith in the people that cared about her. Once this is revealed, it is then known why April became an alcoholic due to her stepfather lying to her mother for years over the sexual abuse and why April chose to live a life without children and resenting her stepfather for what he did to her. Afterward, she drops the radio into the water, giving Randy a severe electric shock. Randy barely jumps out just in time, and Sandino orders him to leave in three minutes.

April goes to Club Indigo for a drink and blames herself for not seeing the signs, just like her mother didn't see the signs with her. Sandino tries to stop her from drinking while mentioning that Randy has moved out, but she pushes him away. She then asks Sandino if he is a child molester because of all the attention he gives the children. Sandino tells April of his childhood as a child laborer and explains that he loves the children so much because he sees himself in them. Feeling hurt at her unfair accusations, Sandino says farewell to the children and leaves.

Jennifer and April begin to get along and connect after April tells Jennifer about her bad experience as a child. Jennifer tells her that she should recognize Sandino as a good man. Eventually, Sandino returns and April apologizes to him and admits that she loves him like a friend. Sandino tells her that she can't love anyone until she learns to love herself. He tells April that he is in love with her, but he wants April to love him back the same way he loves her. He shows her by kissing her.

Eventually, April and Sandino get married. April and Sandino then hold a block party for their reception with Tanya singing "Good Woman Down", dedicated to April, then the new couple is shown embracing and sharing a passionate kiss.

Cast
 Taraji P. Henson as April, an alcoholic nightclub singer at Club Indigo
 Adam Rodriguez as Sandino, a Colombian immigrant that moves in with April
 Brian White as Randy, April's abusive boyfriend
 Mary J. Blige as Tanya, a bartender at Club Indigo
 Gladys Knight as Wilma, a member of the church in April's neighborhood
 Marvin L. Winans as Pastor Brian, the pastor of a church in April's neighborhood
 Tyler Perry as:
 Mabel "Madea" Simmons, a tough old lady
 Joe Simmons, the brother of Madea
 Hope Olaidé Wilson as Jennifer, the niece of April 
 Freddy Siglar as Byron, the nephew of April
 Kwesi Boakye as Manny, the nephew of April who has a medical condition that requires him to take insulin
 Eric Mendenhall as Man #1
 David Paulus as Miller
 Randall Taylor as Mr. Bradley
 Tess Malis Kincaid as Ms. Sullivan
 Joseph Taylor as Announcer
 Cheryl B. Pratt as 911 Dispatcher

Music
The film features 13 songs, including two new songs by Blige. Perry was not able to produce a soundtrack album for the film due to the various record companies involved.

 "Good Woman Down" (Robert F. Aries, Blige, Sean Garrett, Freddie Jackson, Meli'sa Morgan) – Mary J. Blige
 "I Can Do Bad" (Blige, Chuck Harmony, Shaffer Smith) – Mary J. Blige
 "Playboy" (Michael Akinlabi, Tasha Schumann) – Candy Coated Killahz
 "Contagious" (Xavier Dphrepaulezz) – Chocolate Butterfly
 "H.D.Y." (Ronnie Garrett, Herman (Pnut) Johnson) – Club Indigo Band
 "Indigo Blues" (Garrett, Johnson) – Club Indigo Band
 "Lovers Heat" (Garrett, Johnson) – Club Indigo Band
 "Tears of Pain" (Foster) – Ruthie Foster
 "Rock Steady" (Aretha Franklin) – Cheryl Pepsii Riley 
 "The Need to Be" (Jim Weatherly) – Gladys Knight
 "Just Don't Wanna Know/Over It Now" (Winans) – Gladys Knight and Marvin L. Winans
 "Oh Lord I Want You to Help Me" (Traditional, arranged by Jerome Chambers & Edward O'Neal) – Cheryl Pepsii Riley & Marvin L. Winans

Reception

Critical response
I Can Do Bad All by Myself received generally positive reviews from critics. The site's consensus states: "Though somewhat formulaic and predictable, Perry succeeds in mixing broad humor with sincere sentimentality to palatable effect." Metacritic reported that the film has a score of 55 out of 100 based on 13 critics, indicating "mixed or average reviews". Audiences polled by CinemaScore gave the film an average grade of "A" on an A+ to F scale.

Entertainment Weeklys Lisa Schwarzbaum gave the movie an "A−" grade, saying, "After a summer of phony, pasty rom-coms, do this: See a movie where old-fashioned notions of love, faith, strength, and the possibility of redemption are taken seriously." Ty Burr of The Boston Globe called the film "overlong but well-shaped and involving", praising Perry for finding a balanced mix of "earnest soap opera moralism with [his] comic instincts", calling it his "most confident and competent mixture of uplifting black middle-class melodrama and low-down comedy." Cliff Doerksen of the Chicago Reader said about the film: "Contrived, sentimental, tonally bipolar, and as predictable as clockwork, this latest from chitlin' circuit impresario Tyler Perry is just a fat slab of ecstatic entertainment."

Rob Humanick of Slant Magazine felt the film was a great gateway for people not familiar with the "scabrous antics and homegrown moralizing" delivered by the Madea character, saying that Perry lends his creation a more "greater level[s] of tonal consistency" than his previously contradictory Madea Goes to Jail, writing that "I Can Do Bad acknowledges Madea's flaws with loving scrutiny, and doesn't require approval of her more selfish attributes."

Randy Cordova of The Arizona Republic was critical of Perry's filmmaking for delivering lengthy musical numbers and overlooked story elements but gave praise to the performances of Henson and Wilson for showcasing his ability to "create meaty roles for women." The A.V. Clubs Nathan Rabin gave the film a "B−" grade, praising Henson's performance and the "riveting musical numbers" by Knight and Blige for emitting more "feverish emotions" to the film than Perry's "characteristically ham-fisted screenplay", concluding that "His oeuvre has always been shameless and over the top, but Bad might just be the first of Perry’s films to border on operatic." Kimberley Jones of The Austin Chronicle criticized Perry for prolonging the film's conclusion but gave him credit for bringing "increasingly mature moviemaking" to his production, highlighting the Madea scenes as being "pretty damn funny" and the performances of Wilson and Henson for being "nuanced and quite moving" and having a "likable screen presence" respectively.

References

External links
 
 
 
 
 
 
 Tyler Perry's I Can Do Bad All by Myself at MovieSet

2009 films
2009 comedy films
2009 drama films
2009 romantic comedy-drama films
2000s American films
2000s English-language films
2000s musical comedy-drama films
2000s romantic musical films
African-American musical films
African-American romantic comedy-drama films
American films based on plays
American romantic comedy-drama films
American romantic musical films
Films about interracial romance
Films directed by Tyler Perry
Films scored by Aaron Zigman
Films shot in Atlanta
Films with screenplays by Tyler Perry
Lionsgate films